United Nations Security Council Resolution 296, adopted unanimously on August 18, 1971, after examining the application of  Bahrain for membership in the United Nations, the Council recommended to the General Assembly that Bahrain be admitted.

See also
 List of United Nations Security Council Resolutions 201 to 300 (1965–1971)

References
Text of the Resolution at undocs.org

External links
 

 0296
 0296
 0296
August 1971 events
1971 in Bahrain